The 1988 Japanese Grand Prix was a Formula One motor race held at Suzuka Circuit on 30 October 1988. It was the fifteenth and penultimate race of the  season.

Report

Qualifying
On Honda's home track, the McLarens of Ayrton Senna and Alain Prost filled the front row. Senna's pole time was 1.8 seconds slower than Gerhard Berger's 1987 time.

Berger himself could only manage third on the grid, joined on the second row by Ivan Capelli in the naturally aspirated March-Judd. On the third row were the two Lotus-Hondas of outgoing World Champion Nelson Piquet, who was suffering from a virus, and home town favourite Satoru Nakajima, whose mother had died on the Friday morning. Lotus showed great faith in Nakajima by announcing that they had re-signed him for the  season, despite the fact that they would have to use Judd engines after Honda's decision to supply McLaren exclusively.

French driver Yannick Dalmas was declared medically unfit for the race and was replaced in the Larrousse team by Japan's Aguri Suzuki, who was on his way to winning the 1988 Japanese Formula 3000 Championship. Suzuki qualified 20th on his F1 debut, one place behind temporary teammate Philippe Alliot. Dalmas, originally thought to have an ear infection that kept him out of both Japan and the final race in Australia, was diagnosed with Legionnaires' disease later in the year.

Race
The all-McLaren front row was the 11th of the year, but its drivers had contrasting fortunes. Prost led away from Berger and Capelli, while Senna stalled on the grid. However, Suzuka had the only sloping grid of the year and so the Brazilian was able to bump start his car into action. He had dropped to 14th place, but immediately made a charge through the field, gaining six places by the end of the first lap and then passing Riccardo Patrese, Thierry Boutsen, Alessandro Nannini and Michele Alboreto to run fourth on lap 4. Meanwhile, Derek Warwick and Nigel Mansell collided and had to pit for a puncture and a new nose cone, respectively, while Capelli not only set the fastest lap but also passed Berger – who was already troubled with fuel consumption problems – on lap 5 to move into second place. Alboreto was nudged off track by Thierry Boutsen in the Benetton-Ford on lap 8 while he was in sixth place.

On lap 14 the weather started to come into contention as rain began on parts of the circuit, benefiting Senna. On lap 16 Capelli seized his chance to pass Prost for the lead, the first time a non-turbo car had led a Grand Prix since . Prost had been slowed when Suzuki's Lola had spun at the chicane and got going again just as Prost and Capelli were braking for the tight right-left complex. He then missed a gear coming out of the chicane thanks to a troublesome gearbox and was passed by the March, but Capelli's lead only lasted for a few hundred metres as the extra power of the Honda turbo engine allowed Prost to regain the lead going into the first turn. Capelli made several further attempts to overtake Prost before ultimately retiring three laps later with electrical failure.

Mansell's race lasted until lap 24 when he collided with Piquet's Lotus while trying to lap him. Piquet, still unwell with a virus and complaining of double vision, continued for another ten laps before retiring through fatigue.

By then Senna was catching Prost rapidly, and with traffic, Prost's malfunctioning gearbox, and a tricky wet and dry surface, conditions were favourable to the Brazilian. On lap 27, as they attempted to lap Andrea de Cesaris, Nakajima and Maurício Gugelmin, Senna managed to force his way through as Prost was delayed by de Cesaris's Rial. Senna then put in a succession of fast laps, breaking the former lap record and building a lead of over three seconds, despite being delayed while lapping Nakajima.

With slick tyres on a track that was now wet, Senna gestured for the race to be stopped. The race ran out its entire distance, however, with Senna finishing 13 seconds ahead of Prost. Boutsen took third place, whilst Berger recovered to fourth place after Alboreto held up Nannini, who had to settle for fifth. Patrese finished in sixth, and Nakajima was 7th.

With victory in the race, Senna clinched the World Championship. Due to the scoring system in 1988, Prost could only add three more points to his total even if he won in Australia, which would give him 87 points in total. If Senna then failed to score they would be equal on points, but Senna would still win the title, having taken more wins (8 to 7). Victory in Japan was also Senna's eighth win of the season, which beat the record for total wins in a single season, previously held by Jim Clark and Prost.

Classification

Pre-qualifying

Qualifying

Race

Championship standings after the race
Bold text indicates the World Champions.

Drivers' Championship standings

Constructors' Championship standings

 Note: Only the top five positions are included for both sets of standings. Drivers could only count their best 11 results; numbers without parentheses are Championship points; numbers in parentheses are total points scored. Points accurate at final declaration of results. The Benettons were subsequently disqualified from the Belgian Grand Prix and their points reallocated.

References

Japanese Grand Prix
Japanese Grand Prix
Grand Prix
October 1988 sports events in Asia